Mps one binder kinase activator-like 3 is an enzyme that in humans is encoded by the MOBKL3 gene.

Function 

This gene was identified based on its similarity with the mouse counterpart. Studies of the mouse counterpart suggest that the expression of this gene may be regulated during oocyte maturation and preimplantation following zygotic gene activation.  Alternatively spliced transcript variants encoding distinct isoforms have been observed.

Interactions 

MOBKL3 has been shown to interact with:

 CTTNBP2NL,
 CTTNBP2, 
 FAM40A,
 PDCD10, 
 PPP2CA, 
 RP6-213H19.1, 
 STK24, 
 STK25, 
 STRN3, 
 STRN,  and
 TRAF3IP3.

References

Further reading